Junior Senior were a Danish pop duo. The duo consisted of Jesper "Junior" Mortensen (vocals, guitar, keyboards, bass guitar, drums, percussion) (born 7 February 1977) and Jeppe "Senior" Laursen (vocals, programming) (born 25 December 1975). They were well known for their 2002 single "Move Your Feet", which gained worldwide success in 2003, most notably in the United Kingdom.

History

Early career
Junior Senior formed in 1998 when Jesper Mortensen and Jeppe Laursen got back together after their previous band Ludo-X broke up in 1995. The band signed a deal with Danish label Crunchy Frog Records.

D-D-Don't Don't Stop the Beat
The band released their debut album D-D-Don't Don't Stop the Beat in 2002. The first single, "Move Your Feet", was one of the most played songs on Danish radio and eventually climbed the charts in over thirteen countries, including the United States, Australia, France, and the United Kingdom. The single is available on the soundtrack of the popular American television show Queer Eye for the Straight Guy. "Move Your Feet" is featured on the Northern American music video game Dance Dance Revolution Extreme for the PlayStation 2. Ubisoft included the song in the Wii game, Just Dance 2. It was a featured dance. It is associated with its animated pixel art music video, as seen in the VH1 commercial for I Love the 90's: Part Deux and in the background of its Dance Dance Revolution: DDR Extreme dance. It was featured on the soundtrack of the movie, White Chicks. "Move Your Feet" appears as background music in the 2003 film Looney Tunes: Back in Action and is featured in the movie How to Eat Fried Worms (2006) as the "finishing" song before and during the end credits. In 2013, "Move Your Feet" was used in a television commercial for Google Chromebook.  Kohl's Active also used this song in their 'bust a brand new move' advert (2015).

The follow-up single, "Rhythm Bandits", made the singles charts in the UK and Australia, and was included in the soundtrack of the game FIFA Football 2004.

D-D-Don't Don't Stop the Beat was included in several publications' "Best Albums of 2003" lists, including Rolling Stone, NME, Entertainment Weekly and Blender. The Sunday Chronicle in San Francisco rated "Move Your Feet" as the single of the year, calling it "the best song ever".

The CD features the video to "Move Your Feet" (made by designer group Shynola) and a "Making Of" as enhanced content.

The single "Shake Your Coconuts" is available on the Looney Tunes: Back in Action soundtrack, and is used as the menu music in the game Worms 3D by Team17. It was also featured in the 2004 movie Confessions of a Teenage Drama Queen and Malcolm in the Middle's season 5 episode "Experiment". In addition, on 21 July 2017, the band Phish used the song as the kickoff for a 13-night run at Madison Square Garden dubbed The Baker's Dozen. The song coincided with free coconut donuts given to the audience.

The song "White Trash" from this album was used in the advertisement for music magazine TV show Popworld in the United Kingdom. The advert featured the two presenters of the show doing a synchronized dance routine to the song whilst wearing identical outfits.

Hey Hey My My Yo Yo
Junior Senior released their second album, Hey Hey My My Yo Yo on 24 August 2005 in Japan. It was released in the US in 2007. The first single from the album was "Itch U Can't Skratch". The track "Take My Time" features Cindy Wilson and Kate Pierson of new wave band The B-52's. "Take My Time" has also been featured in the PSP video game Lumines II.

In February 2006 and March 2006 the band held a contest for fans to appear in a music video for their song "Can I Get Get Get". The song "Can I Get Get Get" has been used on the TV shows Ugly Betty, Cavemen, Castle, Eastbound & Down and was featured in the film What Happens in Vegas. This song was also featured on the Nordic edition of Lips as an on-disc song as well as downloadable content worldwide. The music video for this song was released on 25 July 2006.

"Hip Hop a Lula" was featured in a Sears back-to-school commercial in August 2007. It was also used extensively in Network Ten Australia's advertising in 2008.

Disbandment
Mortensen and Laursen announced on their blog that they would split and pursue solo projects on 26 September 2008. Both Junior and Senior have launched new projects. In 2008, Mortensen released a 12" single called "Trust Tissue" under the moniker I Scream Ice Cream on Kitsune Records. In 2010, Mortensen formed the group MAKE OUT. Laursen began working on a debut album, but only released the Big Lucky EP in May 2009.

Discography

Studio albums

EPs

Singles

Footnotes
British chart reference
APeaked at number 29 in France originally in 2003 but reached number 11 in a re-release in 2013

Awards and nominations

References

External links

 Junior Senior on Myspace
 Junior Senior chart information
 Junior Senior at AllMusic
 MTV Europe July 2005 interview with Junior Senior, and concert clips

Danish dance music groups
Danish musical duos
Atlantic Records artists
Musical groups established in 1998
Musical groups disestablished in 2008
People from Thisted